Evandro Agazzi (born 1934) is an Italian philosopher and professor at the University of Genoa. His fields of interest are ethics of science and technology, logic, metaphysics, philosophy of language, philosophy of science, philosophical anthropology, and systems theory.

Education 
He is a graduate of the University of Milan where he studied physics and the Catholic University of Milan where he earned a Ph.D. in philosophy in 1957. Agazzi also did post graduate work at Oxford and the universities of Marburg and Münster.

Teaching 
Agazzi taught mathematics at Genoa, and philosophy of science and mathematical logic at the Catholic University of Milan. He then was named professor of the philosophy of science at Genoa in 1970. He was named chair of philosophical anthropology, philosophy of nature and philosophy of science at the University of Fribourg in 1979. He has served as visiting professor at the University of Düsseldorf, the University of Berne, the University of Pittsburgh, Stanford University, and the University of Geneva as well as other institutions of learning.

Professional associations 
He is currently president of the International Academy of Philosophy of Science, honorary president of the International Federation of Philosophical Societies and of the International Institute of Philosophy. He previously served as president of the Italian Society of Logic and Philosophy of Science, the Italian Philosophical Society, and the Swiss Society of Logic and Philosophy of Science. He served as treasurer of the International Council for Philosophy and Humanities of UNESCO. He also has been a member of the Italian National Committee for Bioethics.

Publications

Editor

Journals 
Agazzi was the editor of Epistemologia, a former Italian journal for the philosophy of science, and of Nuova Secondaria, an Italian journal for high school teachers. He is a consulting editor for several international journals, including Revue Internationale de Philosophie, Zeitschrift für allgemeine Wissenschaftstheorie and Modern Logic.

Author

Journal articles 
Agazzi has published over seven hundred articles in scholarly journals and essays in volumes of collected works. He is the author of nineteen books, including Philosophie, Science, Métaphysique, Right, Wrong and Science: The Ethical Dimensions of the Techno-Scientific Enterprise

Books 
Philosophy of Mathematics Today (with György Darvas, 1997)
Realism and Quantum Physics (1998)
Advances in the Philosophy of Technology (with Hans Lenk, 1999)
The Reality of the Unobservable (with Massimo Pauri, 2000)
Life-Interpretation and the Sense of Illness within the Human Condition: Medicine and Philosophy in a Dialogue (with Anna-Teresa Tymieniecka, 2001)
The Problem of the Unity of Science (with Jan Faye, 2001)
Complexity and Emergence (with Luisa Montecucco, 2002)
Valori e limiti del senso comune (2004)

Awards and honors 
 Centro di Studi Filosofici di Gallarate in 1962 for his book Introduzione ai problemi dell’assiomatica
 Cortina-Ulisse in 1983
 Prince of Liechtenstein Prize in 1983 for his book Il bene, il male e la scienza
 International Prize for Philosophy Salento in 2004 for his global work

External links 
Agazzi's webpage at U of Genoa
"What is Our Knowledge of the Human Being?"
Works by Evandro Agazzi at PhilPapers

Members of the International Academy of Philosophy of Science
1934 births
Living people
Writers from Bergamo
Philosophers of science
Italian logicians
Academic staff of the University of Genoa
Foreign Members of the Russian Academy of Sciences
20th-century Italian philosophers
21st-century Italian philosophers
University of Milan alumni
Academic staff of the Scuola Normale Superiore di Pisa